The 2000 Scottish Challenge Cup final was played on 19 November 2000, at Broadwood Stadium in Cumbernauld and was the 10th staging of the final in the history of the tournament. It was played between Airdrieonians and Livingston both of the First Division. Airdrieonians emerged winners after defeating Livingston 3–2 on penalties following a 2–2 draw after extra time.

Route to the final

Airdrieonians

The first round draw brought Queen of the South to face Airdrieonians at the Excelsior Stadium with the home team emerging 2–1 victors. The second round was an away game at Hamilton Academical with Airdrie producing a 1–0 win and only clean sheet of the tournament. A home game against Clydebank was the reward for reaching the quarter-finals with The Diamonds edging the opposition 4–3 on penalties following a 1–1 draw after extra time. The semi-final draw paired the club with Stranraer away from home and Airdrie produced a 4–2 win to progress to the final. Airdrieonians reached the Scottish Challenge Cup final for the second time in its history since winning the 1994 final against Dundee.

Livingston

Livingston were drawn against Partick Thistle away from home in the first round and produced a 2–0 victory over the club. The second round also saw the West Lothian club drawn away from home against Ross County but produced a 3–0 win and a second consecutive clean sheet. A first home game of the tournament for Livingston was drawn in the quarter-finals against Brechin City which saw the club produce a 3–1 win to progress to the semi-finals. The opposition provided was East Stirlingshire, again at Almondvale and a 2–1 victory saw Livingston reach the Scottish Challenge Cup final for the first time ever.

Pre-match

Analysis
Airdrieonians and Livingston both played two games at their respective homes of Excelsior Stadium and Almondvale Stadium and two games on the road. In the process Airdrie scored a total of eight goals whilst conceding four, compared with Livingston's ten goals scored and two conceded. Livingston completed two clean sheets over Airdrieonians' one. Airdrie reached the final for the second time after winning the 1994 tournament whilst it was the first time in the final for Livingston.

Match

Teams

References

2000
Airdrieonians F.C. (1878) matches
Livingston F.C. matches
Challenge Cup Final
November 2000 sports events in the United Kingdom